Salako is a hat worn in French Antilles. Salako or Selako may also refer to
 Salako language, a dialect of Kendayan language spoken in Borneo
 Selako people, an ethnic of the Dayak people group from Borneo
Andy Salako (born 1972), Nigerian football defender 
John Salako (born 1969), English footballer and sports television personality, brother of Andy 
Lateef Akinola Salako (1935–2017), Nigerian academic